The 2013–14 season was Stade Malherbe Caen's 101st season in existence and the club's second consecutive season in the second division of French football.

Players

Competitions

Overall record

Ligue 2

League table

Results summary

Results by round

Matches

Coupe de France

Coupe de la Ligue

Statistics

Goalscorers

References 

Stade Malherbe Caen seasons
Caen